is a district located in Ibaraki Prefecture, Japan.

Following the Bandō merger but with 2004 population data, the district has an estimated population of 125,153 and a density of 726 persons per km2. The total area is 172.25 km2.

Towns and villages
Goka
Sakai

Mergers
On March 22, 2005, the town of Sashima merged with the neighboring city of Iwai forming the city of Bandō.  
On September 12, 2005, the towns of Sanwa and Sōwa merged into the city of Koga.

Districts in Ibaraki Prefecture